Pietersen is a Dutch and Afrikaans patronymic surname meaning "son of Peter". There are other spellings.  Pietersen is a rare given name.  People with the surname Pietersen include:

Abigail Pietersen (born 1984), South African figure skater, older sister of Justin Pietersen
Charl Pietersen (born 1983), South African cricketer
Charl Pietersen (born 1991), South African darts player
Jessica Pietersen (born 1980), English singer, television personality, and dancer
Joe Pietersen (born 1984), South African rugby player
JP Pietersen (born 1986), South African rugby player
Judith Pietersen (born 1989), Dutch volleyball player
Justin Pietersen (born 1986), South African figure skater, younger brother of Abigail Pietersen
Kevin Pietersen (born 1980), South Africa-born English cricketer
Magdalene Louisa Pietersen (born 1956), South African politician
Roscoe Pietersen (born 1989), South AFrican football player
Willem Essuman Pietersen (c.1844–1914), Gold Coast merchant, politician, and educationist
William G. Pietersen (born 1937), South African businessman and author

Afrikaans-language surnames
Dutch-language surnames
Patronymic surnames
Surnames from given names